Katrina Lehis (born 19 December 1994) is an Estonian left-handed épée fencer, 2018 individual European champion, 2021 team Olympic champion, and 2021 individual Olympic bronze medalist.

Career
Lehis began fencing in 2004. Coached by Helen Nelis-Naukas and Peeter Nelis, she was a member of the Estonian Junior and Cadet fencing teams since 2009. In 2014, Lehis won individual gold at the Junior World Fencing Championships and was named Estonian Young Athlete of the Year. She won team épée silver medals at the 2015 European Fencing Championships and the 2015 European Games. In 2018, Lehis won the individual gold at the 2018 European Fencing Championships. At the 2020 Tokyo Summer Olympics, she won a gold medal in team épée and bronze in individual épée.

Medal Record

Olympic Games

European Championship

Grand Prix

World Cup

Personal life 
In 2017, Lehis gave birth to a son.

References

External links

1994 births
Living people
Sportspeople from Haapsalu
Estonian female épée fencers
Fencers at the 2015 European Games
European Games medalists in fencing
European Games silver medalists for Estonia
Fencers at the 2020 Summer Olympics
Olympic fencers of Estonia
Olympic medalists in fencing
Medalists at the 2020 Summer Olympics
Olympic bronze medalists for Estonia
Olympic gold medalists for Estonia
21st-century Estonian women